Nanjing Shaye Football Club is a professional Chinese football club that currently participates in the China League Two. The team is based in Nanjing, Jiangsu.

History
The club was originally a nondescript local amateur team named Nanjing Zhongshan Yuanlin from the city of Nanjing. In November 2014, Shaye Investment Management Co. Ltd. took over the club, which subsequently adopted its later widely known name Nanjing Shaye.

In 2016, the club formed a 11-a-side team to participate in the Nanjing Super League, and ended up winning the entire championship. Also competing in the China Amateur Football League for its first time in the same year, the club failed to make it out of the second round of group stages.

In 2017, the club signed to cooperate with the football section of Hohai University. After successfully defending its title as the champion of Nanjing amateur football, they participated in 2017 China Amateur Football League and advanced to the final round of 16, but was eliminated by Anhui Hefei Guiguan and failed to advance further and gain access to China League Two.

In 2018, the club won their third Nanjing Super League title in a row, and made it to the final 8 of 2018 Chinese Champions League after beating Wuhan Shangwen 1–0 in the first round of final play-offs, without losing a single goal in all previous stages. However, the club was eliminated by eventual champions Taizhou Yuanda in the quarter-finals. Despite this setback, they thrashed Tianjin Ruihu 4–0 in the subsequent round, finally ensuring promotion and a spot in 2019 China League Two.

Name changes
–2014 Nanjing Zhongshan Yuanlin F.C. 南京中山园林
2014– Nanjing Shaye F.C. 南京沙叶

Current squad
As of 12 July 2019

Reserve squad

Results
All-time league rankings

As of the end of 2019 season.

 In group stage.

Key

 Pld = Played
 W = Games won
 D = Games drawn
 L = Games lost
 F = Goals for
 A = Goals against
 Pts = Points
 Pos = Final position

 DNQ = Did not qualify
 DNE = Did not enter
 NH = Not Held
 WD = Withdrawal
 – = Does Not Exist
 R1 = Round 1
 R2 = Round 2
 R3 = Round 3
 R4 = Round 4

 F = Final
 SF = Semi-finals
 QF = Quarter-finals
 R16 = Round of 16
 Group = Group stage
 GS2 = Second Group stage
 QR1 = First Qualifying Round
 QR2 = Second Qualifying Round
 QR3 = Third Qualifying Round

References

External links
Official club website 

Football clubs in China
Sport in Jiangsu